Alfred Penn (6 January 1855 – 18 October 1889), known as Dick Penn, was an English amateur cricketer who played for Kent County Cricket Club from 1875 to 1884.

Penn was born at The Cedars in Lee in what is now south-east London but was historically part of Kent. He was the son of John Penn, a manufacturer of marine engines with works in Deptford and Greenwich. His brothers Frank and William were both cricketers whilst another brother, John, was the Member of Parliament for Lewisham from 1891 to 1903.

Penn made his first-class cricket debut for Kent in July 1875, playing against Sussex at Hove. He went on to play a total of 48 first-class matches, 41 of which were for Kent.

Penn died at Lee in October 1889 at the age of 34.

References

External links

1855 births
1889 deaths
English cricketers
Kent cricketers
North v South cricketers
Orleans Club cricketers
Gentlemen of England cricketers
Gentlemen of Kent cricketers